is a former speed skater from Japan, who represented his native country at two consecutive Winter Olympics, starting in 1984 in Sarajevo, Yugoslavia. In 1988, he won the bronze medal in the men's 500 metres, after having captured two world titles at the Sprints Championships (1983 and 1987). At the 1984 Winter Olympics, Kuroiwa finished 10th in the men's 500 m.

Kuroiwa, who was born in Tsumagoi, Gunma, was a coach for the Japanese team during the 1998 Winter Olympics.

In Japan, Kuroiwa made headlines in 2000 when he tried to shield Daisuke Matsuzaka from an illegal driving charge by taking the blame for himself.

References

External links
 
 
 
 

1961 births
Living people
Japanese male speed skaters
Olympic speed skaters of Japan
Olympic medalists in speed skating
Olympic bronze medalists for Japan
Speed skaters at the 1984 Winter Olympics
Speed skaters at the 1988 Winter Olympics
Medalists at the 1988 Winter Olympics
Asian Games medalists in speed skating
Asian Games gold medalists for Japan
Asian Games bronze medalists for Japan
Speed skaters at the 1986 Asian Winter Games
Medalists at the 1986 Asian Winter Games
Sportspeople from Gunma Prefecture
World Sprint Speed Skating Championships medalists